North Georgetown is an unincorporated community in western Knox Township, Columbiana County, Ohio, United States. Although unincorporated, it has a post office, with the ZIP code of 44665. The town itself is located at the intersection of Georgetown Road (County Hwy 400) and Rochester Road (County Hwy 402).

History
North Georgetown was laid out in 1830. The community derives its name from George Stidger, an original owner of the town site. A post office called North Georgetown has been in operation since 1833.

References

Unincorporated communities in Ohio
Unincorporated communities in Columbiana County, Ohio
1830 establishments in Ohio
Populated places established in 1830